A diplomatic cable, also known as a diplomatic telegram (DipTel) or embassy cable, is a confidential text-based message exchanged between a diplomatic mission, like an embassy or a consulate, and the foreign ministry of its parent country. A diplomatic cable is a type of dispatch. Other dispatches may be sent as physical documents in a diplomatic bag.

The term cable derives from the time when the medium for such communications was telegraphs travelling along international submarine communications cables, though over time they have progressed into other formats and pathways. The term cablegram is also sometimes used. Due to the importance and sensitive nature of the subject matter, diplomatic cables are protected by the most elaborate security precautions to prevent unfettered access by the public or unauthorized interception by foreign governments. Generally digital in format, they are always encrypted, frequently by unbreakable one time pad ciphers using key material distributed using diplomatic couriers.

See also
 Telegraphy
 United States diplomatic cables leak – Cablegate by WikiLeaks

References

Telegrams
Diplomatic missions
Diplomatic documents